John Strachan (1778–1867) was the Anglican bishop of Toronto, Canada.

John Strachan may also refer to:

Sir John Strachan, 5th Baronet (died 1777), captain in the Royal Navy
John Strachan (explorer) (1846–1922), Scottish-born Australian explorer of New Guinea
John Strachan (linguist) (1862–1907), scholar of Celtic languages at the University of Manchester
John Strachan (bishop of Rangoon) (died 1906), Anglican bishop in India
John Strachan (singer) (1875–1958), Scottish singer
John Strachan (bishop of Brechin) (died 1810), Scottish Episcopal bishop
John Strachan (politician) (1834–?), Scottish-born Wisconsin politician
John Strachan (professor) (born 1961), literary critic, historian and poet
John Strachan (tennis) (1895–1970), American tennis player
John Strachan (cricketer) (1896–1988), English cricketer and British Army officer